Xincai County (postal: Sintsai) is a county in the southeast of Henan province, China, bordering Anhui province to the northeast and east. It is the easternmost county-level division of the prefecture-level city of Zhumadian. Xincai was one of the early locations of the Cai state during the Spring and Autumn period.

Administrative divisions
Xincai county  administers three subdistricts, ten towns, one ethnic town and nine townships.

Climate

References

External links
Area & Population source

County-level divisions of Henan
Zhumadian